Taxandria spathulata is a shrub species that grows along the southern coast of Western Australia. This plant was previously classified as Agonis spathulata but is now part of the Taxandria genus.

Description
The leaves are typically  in length. It blooms between September and October producing small white petal flowers with a diameter of approximately  that appear in dense cluster of about 20 flowers. Each flower contains about 10 stamens, one opposite each sepal and petal.

Distribution
Often found in dense bushland on small hills, low rocky ridges, plains and coastal dunes it is distributed along the south coast in the Great Southern and Goldfields-Esperance regions  where it grows in sandy, peaty clay soils over granite, spongelite or laterite.

Classification
First formally described as Agonis spathulata by the botanist Johannes Conrad Schauer in 1844 as part of  Johann Georg Christian Lehmann's work Plantae Preissianae The plant was subsequently reclassified to T. spathulata in a 2007 revision by Wheeler and Marchant into the new genus Taxandria.

References

spathulata
Myrtales of Australia
Rosids of Western Australia
Trees of Australia
Trees of Mediterranean climate
Plants described in 1844